WMNC (1430 AM) is a radio station licensed to Morganton, North Carolina, United States.  The station signed-on in 1947 and is currently owned by Cooper Broadcasting Company.

References

External links

MNC